The Dean of the Arches is the judge who presides in the provincial ecclesiastical court of the Archbishop of Canterbury. This court is called the Arches Court of Canterbury.  It hears appeals from consistory courts and bishop's disciplinary tribunals in the province of Canterbury.

The Dean of the Arches is appointed jointly by the Archbishop of Canterbury and the Archbishop of York with the approval of the monarch signified by warrant under the sign manual. The same person presides in the Chancery Court of York where he or she has the title of Auditor and hears appeals from consistory courts and bishop's disciplinary tribunals in the province of York. The Dean of the Arches is also Official Principal of the Archbishop of Canterbury and the Archbishop of York, and acts as Master of the Faculties.

The current Dean of the Arches is Morag Ellis,  who succeeded Charles George on 8 June 2020.

List of Deans of the Arches

Notes

Canon law of the Church of England
Lists of English people
English judges